Armadale Thistle Football Club are a football club from the town of Armadale, West Lothian in Scotland.

The club arose from the remnants of the town's former Scottish Football League club, Armadale, who had been based at Volunteer Park, and took over the ground from them.

Club staff

Board of directors

Coaching staff

Source

Managerial history

c Caretaker manager

Honours
Scottish Junior Football Association
Edinburgh & District League champions:1939–40, 1940–41, 1949–50, 1952–53
East Region South Division champions: 2008–09
East Region Division Two champions: 1984–85, 1988–89
Lanarkshire Hozier Cup winners: 1942–43
East of Scotland Junior Cup winners: 1943–44, 1948–49, 1952–53, 1961–62
St. Michael's Cup winners: 1999–00
Brown Cup winners: 1942–43, 1943–44, 1946–47, 1950–51, 1953–54

References

External links
Official website
Club statistics

 
Football clubs in Scotland
Scottish Junior Football Association clubs
Association football clubs established in 1936
Football in West Lothian
1936 establishments in Scotland
Armadale, West Lothian
East of Scotland Football League teams